{{Infobox locomotive
| name=Dayton
| powertype=Steam
| gauge=
| image= V&T18GreatWesternSteamup2022.jpg
| caption=
| whytetype=4-4-0
| currentowner=Nevada State Railroad Museum
| driverdiameter = 
| locoweight     = 
| fueltype       = Wood
| boilerpressure = 
| cylindercount  = Two, outside
| cylindersize   = 
| tractiveeffort = 
| builddate=September, 1873
| builder=Central Pacific Railroad's Sacramento Shops
| officialname=Dayton
| serialnumber=6
| operator=Virginia and Truckee Railroad
| fleetnumbers=18
| firstrundate=
| disposition=On static display
{{Designation list
| embed = yes 
| designation1 = NRHP
| designation1_offname = Virginia and Truckee RR. Engines No. 18, The Dayton; and No. 22, The Inyo
| designation1_date = December 18, 1973
| designation1_number = 73002245
}}
}}
The Virginia and Truckee 18 Dayton is a historic standard gauge steam locomotive on display in Sacramento, California. It spent its working life on the Virginia and Truckee Railroad.

The locomotive was placed on the National Register of Historic Places, along with the Inyo, because of their association with the Virginia and Truckee Railroad and transportation development in Nevada.

The Dayton, a 4-4-0 "American", was built in 1873 by the Central Pacific Railroad, in Sacramento, California, and was based on the design of the CP's 173 engine.  The locomotive weighs , has  driving wheels, and carried  of water and 3 cords of wood.  A large snow plow was fixed to the front of the locomotive in 1879, and it performed snow clearing duties on the Virginia & Truckee lines during the winters for most of its operational life, in addition to its normal passenger hauling duties.

In 1906 the locomotive had the honor of opening the branch line between Carson City and Minden, Nevada, but after that it was used less frequently. In 1908 it was converted to burn oil rather than wood. In 1937, the locomotive, minus the plow, was sold for $1,000 together with No. 22 Inyo to Paramount Pictures who then had the locomotive overhauled at the Southern Pacific Railroad shops at Sparks, Nevada. Paramount had the locomotive repainted and renumbered for use in motion pictures.

 The Dayton film history 

The Dayton appeared in several movies, beginning with Union Pacific.  It traveled to New York City in 1939 to promote this film.  Other movies featuring the Dayton include Young Tom Edison, The Harvey Girls and Duel in the Sun.

Post-Retirement
In 1938 the locomotive was sold to Paramount Pictures and in 1939 was double-headed with the UP GE Steam turbine locomotives as locomotive number 58 for the Cecil B. DeMille's Union Pacific film of that same year.  In 1969 the locomotive participated in ceremonies for the centennial of the Golden Spike. Dayton was modified to represent Union Pacific's No. 119. It remained at the Golden Spike National Historic Site throughout most of the 1970s, along with the V&T's Inyo, which was modified to represent the Central Pacific's Jupiter. In 1974, both locomotives were sold to the State of Nevada, but remained in Utah while brand-new replicas of the Golden Spike locomotives were under construction. Both Inyo and Dayton finally arrived at the Nevada State Railroad Museum in Carson City in late 1978.

Once at the museum, the Inyo and Dayton were evaluated for possible restoration to operating condition.  The boiler of the latter was found to be in poor condition and would require replacing for the engine to operate.  Since the Dayton's boiler was original, it was decided to instead give the engine a cosmetic restoration. Dayton made its debut at the museum on Memorial Day weekend, 1982.

In 2005, the Dayton was moved to the Comstock History Center in Virginia City, Nevada, where it was displayed until April 2018. It was then returned to the Nevada State Railroad Museum in exchange for Virginia and Truckee 4-6-0 No. 27, which took the Dayton's place on exhibit at the Comstock History Center.  In July, 2022, the engine will be loaned to the California State Railroad Museum for a period of two years, during which time the Genoa and the J.W. Bowker'' will take the Dayton's place in Carson City.

References

4-4-0 locomotives
National Register of Historic Places in Carson City, Nevada
Railway locomotives introduced in 1873
Railway locomotives on the National Register of Historic Places in Nevada
Virginia and Truckee Railroad
Nevada State Register of Historic Places
Standard gauge locomotives of the United States
Preserved steam locomotives of Nevada